Fantasy Grounds is a virtual tabletop application, which contains a set of tools to assist players of tabletop role-playing games playing either in person or remotely.

History

Fantasy Grounds was first released in 2004 by SmiteWorks, originally based in Espoo, Finland. In 2009, the company was purchased by Doug Davison, after which it purchased licenses for content for several tabletop role-playing game systems. In April 2015, SmiteWorks acquired a license with Wizards of the Coast for official Dungeons & Dragons game content and began releasing products for the game's 5th edition on Fantasy Grounds; the same month, Fantasy Grounds became available to purchase through the Steam digital distribution platform. In December 2016, SmiteWorks obtained a license from Paizo Publishing for content from their Pathfinder Roleplaying Game, which was released on Fantasy Grounds starting in May 2017. In May 2019, Fantasy Grounds ran a successful Kickstarter campaign to fund Fantasy Grounds Unity, a new version of their software built in Unity.

Features 

Fantasy Grounds contains features typical of many tabletop role-playing games, such as virtual dice rolling, character sheets, and maps with a grid system. Games are organized into sessions, which are started by a gamemaster and which other players may join remotely. Unlike many other virtual tabletop systems, the user interface of Fantasy Grounds is different depending on which game system is selected for the session. Fantasy Grounds also contains various reference materials and rulebooks, as well as an integrated chat system. The program automates much of the dice rolling and other game systems, and allows the gamemaster to save a session to continue later.

Fantasy Grounds officially supports about a dozen game systems. In addition to various editions of Dungeons & Dragons and Pathfinder, support is offered for Savage Worlds, Call of Cthulhu,  Traveller, Rolemaster, Castles & Crusades and others. The Fantasy Grounds community has also created unofficial versions for many other systems, and players can also create fully custom rulesets.

Reception 

Fantasy Grounds is often praised by reviewers for its features and toolsets which allow players to fully customize their games. It is also considered one of the most reliable virtual tabletop programs. However, it is also often criticized for its complexity and cost, especially since there are several free competitors with similar features.

See also
Roll20
D&DBeyond

References

External links

FG Con website

Role-playing game software